The A87 autoroute is a motorway in western France. It connects Angers with the coast and western north–south motorway the A83.

Junctions

Exchange A87-N260 Junction with the RN260 to Angers and A11.
23 (Mûrs-Erigné) Towns served: Mûrs-Erigné
24 (Thouarcé) Towns served: Beaulieu-sur-Layon
Péage de Beaulieu
25 (Chemillé) Towns served: Chemillé
Service Area: Trementines
26 (Cholet-nord) Towns served: Cholet
27 (Cholet-sud) Towns served: Cholet, Nantes via RN249 (E62)
28 (Verrie) Towns served: La Verrie
Rest Area: Verrie
29 (Les Herbiers) Towns served: Les Herbiers
Service Area: Herbiers
Exchange des Essarts: A87-A83 Junction with the A83
Péage de la Roche-sur-Yon
30 (la Roche-sur-Yon-Est) Towns served: La Roche-sur-Yon
31 (la Roche-sur-Yon-Centre) Towns served: La Roche-sur-Yon
32 (la Roche-sur-Yon-Sud) Towns served: La Roche-sur-Yon
33 (la Roche-sur-Yon-Ouest) Towns served: La Roche-sur-Yon  autoroute end with a junction onto the RD160 to Les Sables-d'Olonne.

References

External links

 A87 Motorway in Saratlas

A87